Rebecca Price may refer to:
 Rebecca Lane Pennypacker Price (1837-1919), American nurse
 Rebecca Price (boxer), Welsh contestant in 2012 AIBA Women's World Boxing Championships
 Rebecca Price (soccer), Australian player in 2012 W-League grand final
 Rebecca Price (runner), American winner of 1984 women's Antwerp Marathon